Sankt Veit in Defereggen is a municipality in the district of Lienz in the Austrian state of Tyrol.

Geography
Sankt Veit lies in the central Defereggen valley and is the municipality in Eastern Tyrol with the highest elevation. It lies on the sunny side of the valley, and in the past grain and potatoes were raised there. However, there can be snowfall even in the summer months.

References

External links 
 Homepage der Gemeinde - town website

Villgraten Mountains
Cities and towns in Lienz District